Wamanrao Mahdik (1925-1999) was a leader of Shiv Sena. He was the first Shiv Sena member elected to Maharashtra Legislative Assembly. He was elected from Parel constituency in 1969–70 bypoll. He was mayor of Mumbai in 1978.

He was a member of Maharashtra Legislative Council during 1980–1986. He was member of 9th Lok Sabha (1989-1991) elected from Mumbai South Central (Lok Sabha constituency). He contested 1991 Lok Sabha election from Rajapur with Shiv Sena - BJP combine and came second, pushing Madhu Dandavate of Janata Dal to third place.

Wamanrao Mahadik was born on 17 March 1925 at Talere, Tehsil-Kankavali, Sindhudurg District, Maharashtra. And he died in Mumbai on 12 October 1999.

References

Shiv Sena politicians
Mayors of Mumbai
Lok Sabha members from Maharashtra
Maharashtra MLAs 1967–1972
India MPs 1989–1991
1925 births
1999 deaths
Marathi politicians